Kotii Reddy is an Indian businessman. He is the founder chairman of Kotii Group of Ventures, Hyderabad.

Early life 
Reddy was born and brought up in Gudivada, Krishna District. He hails from a middle-class family. He completed his SSC in 1998 and studied PGDCA course in Gudivada. At age 14, he came to Hyderabad to excel in computers and worked as computer faculty of C Language. He was hired by Microsoft despite not having completed a college degree. 

He became one of the youngest Java Certified Professional (JCP) in India. He was later selected as Project head by the Application Architect at Microsoft.

After he joined Microsoft, he completed his graduation and a Doctorate from the University of Washington.

Career 
After ten years at Microsoft, he left to create Kotii Group of Ventures, a group of self-sufficient, profitable ventures aimed at reaching 784 core people around 238 countries in sectors including Health Tech, Core Tech R&D, Edutech, Fintech, Philanthropy, Mediatech, Life Sciences, Agritech, Construction and Mass Tech by owning  companies including Bharath Innovations, Digital Education, DZ Pay, Kotii Foundation, India Herald, Bodha, Seva Foundation, Crowd blood, Citrus Clinic and Snaggerr. Kotii group owns 70 percent of each company, of which 33% is pledged for underprivileged kids, widows and seniors.

Social service 
Reddy adopted two Government schools in Andhra Pradesh, Government Jilla Parishad High School in Nandivada and Mandal Parishad School, Jonapadu. Both schools achieved a 100% Pass Rate in the SSC Results across 700 students. Here is to new India coverage of Forbes India about Mr. Reddy along with his KOTII GROUP of companies their positive impact on community.

References 

Year of birth missing (living people)
Living people
University of Washington alumni
Indian industrialists